Mister X is a fictional character, a supervillain appearing in American comic books published by Marvel Comics. The character was introduced in Wolverine vol. 2 #159 (Feb. 2001). His henchmen include T & A (nicknamed "Betty and Veronica" by Wolverine), and Blok.

Fictional character biography
Mister X is an extremely wealthy businessman who has demonstrated a psychological addiction to killing that, by his own account, started in his adolescence. His latent telepathic power was awakened by seeing a woman who had been hit by a car, which fascinated him; he felt her die. He soon became obsessed with death.

As a youth, X committed several murders to recreate the high of telepathically connecting with another person at the moment of their death. He murdered his pet dog by locking it in an oven, followed soon after by his entire family, including his mother and father. Over the years X would commit hundreds of murders and had his identity erased. Using his family's considerable fortune, X traveled throughout the world and studied under some of the finest martial artists in the world. After X learned all he could from each of his teachers, he would kill them. The thrill of killing an opponent in hand-to-hand combat provided him with a rush that he had never dreamed of. X kept a public image of a handsome, single, wealthy socialite, while he secretly coveted the honor of being the greatest hand to hand combat fighter on earth, which, of course, meant killing all of the other greatest fighters.

For every murder, X would cut a scar somewhere on his body. By the time he met Wolverine, his torso was covered in hundreds of them arranged in an ornate pattern. X defeated Wolverine in their first battle, but was amazed at his opponent's skills, bravery, and tenacity. X told Wolverine the story of his life up to that point, and then offered to spare Wolverine's life if he would agree to sign over the rights to the title of 'The Best There Is' and join his new murder avant-garde, much as T and A and Blok had done.  Wolverine refused and engaged X in battle once again. This time, hearing of X's crimes and the lives he had destroyed over the years, pushed Wolverine over the edge, and he slipped into a berserker rage. While in this state, Wolverine's conscious mind essentially shut down and the primal, savage instincts brought on by his mutation took over. Even though X stabbed and slashed him with swords and knives, impaled him with a spear, shot him with a machine gun, and set him on fire with a flamethrower, Wolverine continued to fight. In the end, Wolverine's determination and healing powers proved too much for X to overcome. X himself received several severe injuries, including deep lacerations down the length of his chest and stomach. He would have been killed had his bodyguard, Blok, not interfered.

Their third and final battle, at the Bloodsport tournament, went similarly. X had just defeated Taskmaster in a steel cage match, with Taskmaster surviving only due to a referee declaring the bout over upon X leaving the cage and preventing X from re-entering to finish his opponent off (X murders the referee for robbing him of his kill). At first, the battle appeared to be going in a similar direction as their first. No matter what Wolverine did, X was immediately prepared with a counter to Wolverine's offense. Wolverine noted to himself that X's movements, his technique, and form were absolutely flawless.

During this time, the Taskmaster (frustrated by the humiliating defeat he had suffered) attempted to kill X by firing an incendiary arrow at him from underneath the ring in which he and Wolverine were fighting. Wolverine's enhanced senses alerted him to Taskmaster's presence and allowed him to anticipate the attack, which would have harmed him as well, and allowed him to get out of the way before it hit. To Wolverine's surprise, X also moved out of harm's way, as though he had also sensed the danger. As the fire from the arrow spread across the ring, temporarily separating the two combatants, Wolverine recalled X telling him that he had been able to feel a girl die when he was younger. Reminded of how Jean Grey had learned of her powers (by reading the mind of her childhood friend Annie when Annie was killed in a car accident in front of her), Wolverine surmised that X must have telepathic abilities enabling him to predict his opponent's moves. The natural solution to such a talent is not to think while fighting; to slip into a berserker fury as he had done during their second fight. He allowed himself to slip into a berserker rage and the tide immediately changed. Despite his skill, X was unable to predict Wolverine's moves. Wolverine, who is a highly skilled martial artist himself, soon had the advantage. The ring eventually collapsed but not before Wolverine had knocked X into one of the corners containing the championship belt. X picked up the belt and declared that he had won the match, which was technically true according to the rules of the tournament. Despite this, Wolverine was poised to deliver the death blow but Blok, once again, saved X's life.

Frustrated at his first real loss- aware that he only won his last fight against Wolverine via a technicality, Mister X spent several months training against other martial artists to re-learn how to fight without relying on his opponents' conscious thoughts to guide him, culminating in him killing a kindergarten teacher and challenging Wolverine to face him in the Museum of Natural History or he would kill the teacher's students. However, during the fight, Wolverine determined that Mister X's desire for the thrill of the fight could be used against him, simply refusing to fight X and relying on his healing factor to take whatever his opponent attempted to inflict on him, Wolverine leaving the museum as X was forced to face the reality of an opponent he could not kill who would nevertheless refuse to fight him.

Thunderbolts
The Thunderbolts are sent after Mister X by Norman Osborn. The Black Widow briefs them about Mister X, who informs them that he will be attending Madripoor's opera house with Tyger Tiger, and that the Black Widow and Paladin will pretend to be ballet dancers. Stun guns are teleported into the disguised Thunderbolts, and Mister X moves in to intercept them. As the witnesses flee, the Thunderbolts reveal that their assassination attempt was a sham, and that Mister X had arranged to meet them there. A body double is teleported in, and incinerated to cover Mister X's disappearance, and he is welcomed as the newest member of the Thunderbolts. He reveals that he does not need Osborn's money, and is looking for a challenge, but the downtime between missions becomes frustrating for him, prompting him to hijack a teleporter and jump into a South American warzone to kill the guerilla fighters in the area. With great pleasure, Mr. X later participated in the "Siege" crossover, fighting and even killing Asgardians. After Osborn was proven defeated, Mr. X briefly possessed the Spear of Odin, but was savagely beaten and disarmed by Quicksilver, who openly mocked Mister X's inability to hurt him despite Quicksilver's limited hand-to-hand combat experience. Mr. X disappeared before being arrested.

Powers and abilities
Mister X possesses low-level psychic abilities; his nervous system automatically maps onto the neural motor-function precursors of anyone in close proximity, allowing him to reflexively predict their moves and counter them effortlessly. The combination of his skills and these psychic powers was sufficient for X to defeat the Taskmaster, who is one of the finest combatants on Earth, and made it look easy.

However his psychic ability has its limits as he was unable to match the speed of Quicksilver's attacks. His lack of superhuman physical powers contributes greatly to his unwillingness to confront genuine superhuman opponents such as Spider-Man, Luke Cage, or the Hulk, as their vastly superior physical abilities would render his ability to predict their actions useless; Quicksilver mocked him for this by referring to him as "the least dangerous man on the planet." Wolverine has also managed to defeat X in combat by provoking himself into a berserker rage while they fight, thus preventing X from predicting what Wolverine will do next as Wolverine himself is unaware what he shall attempt in that state; Iron Fist has also managed to defeat him in a confrontation by relying on the unpredictable Drunken Master style of kung-fu.

X possesses the physical capabilities of a man that is in the peak of physical condition. His physical abilities of strength, speed, stamina, agility, dexterity, reflexes and reactions, coordination, balance, and endurance are on par with those of Captain America. Mr. X claims to be a master of every earthly form of martial arts and some alien fighting styles including Kree and Shi'ar. Mr. X is also highly proficient with a variety of weaponry including swords, knives, staffs, and firearms. He also has an uncanny tolerance for physical pain and may be a masochist.

In other media
Mister X is listed as an opponent who will be facing Ken Masters in a martial arts tournament depicted in Ryu's ending for Marvel vs. Capcom 3: Fate of Two Worlds.

References

External links
 UncannyXmen.net Character Profile on Mister X

Comics characters introduced in 2001
Fictional serial killers
Marvel Comics martial artists
Marvel Comics mutants
Marvel Comics supervillains
Marvel Comics telepaths